Ezzeldin Muktar is an Academian and a Professor of Pharmacognosy and Drug Development. He is a former substantive Vice chancellor of Bauchi State University.

Early life and education
Muktar was born on 18 November 1957 in Egypt. He had his primary and secondary education at Banha Primary school and Banha Secondary school respectively at Cairo. He got his Bachelor of Pharmaceutical Sciences from the University of Cairo (1980). He got his Msc (1986), Phd (1998) and MBA (1999) in Pharmacognocy from Ahmadu Bello University (ABU).

Career
He has served as Head of Department and Dean of Pharmaceutical Sciences of Ahmadu Bello University, Zaria. He was also a Vice Chancellor for Kaduna State University.
He is a member of seven professional bodies both within and outside Nigeria. He is currently the president of Nigeria Society of Pharmacognocy.

Awards
He was awarded Kaduna State PSN, Merit award (1994), PANS ABU Merit Award, and also Ahmadu Bello University Merit Award (1995).

Publications
He has over fifty publications he authored and co-authored.

References

1957 births
Living people
Academic staff of Ahmadu Bello University
Cairo University alumni
Nigerian pharmacologists